There are many different surgical specialties, some of which require very specific kinds of surgical instruments to perform. 

General surgery is a specialty focused on the abdominal contents, as well as the thyroid gland, and diseases involving skin, breasts, various soft tissues, trauma, peripheral vascular disease, hernias, and endoscopic procedures. 

This page is dedicated specifically to listing surgical instruments used in general surgery. 

Instruments can be classified in many ways - but broadly speaking, there are five kinds of instruments.
 Cutting and dissecting instruments: 
Scalpels, scissors, and saws are the most traditional.
Elevators can be both cutting and lifting/retracting.
Although the term dissection is broad, energy devices such as diathermy/cautery are often used as more modern alternatives.
 Grasping or holding instruments: 
Classically this included forceps and clamps predominantly.
Roughly, forceps can be divided into traumatic (tissue crushing) and atraumatic (tissue preserving, such as Debakey's)
Numerous examples are available for different purposes by field.
 Hemostatic instruments: 
This includes instruments utilized for the cessation of bleeding.
Artery forceps are a classic example in which bleeding is halted by direct clamping of a vessel.
Sutures are often used, aided by a needle holder.
Cautery and related instruments are used with increasing frequency in high resource countries.
 Retractors: 
Surgery is often considered to be largely about exposure.
A multitude of retractors exist to aid in exposing the body's cavities accessed during surgery.
These can broadly be handheld (often by a junior assistant) or self-retaining.
Elevators can be both cutting and lifting/retracting.
 Tissue unifying instruments and materials: 
This would include instruments that aid in tissue unification (such as needle holders or staple applicators) 
And the materials themselves 

Instruments used in surgery are:

References 

Surgical instruments
Surgical instruments
 Surgical instruments